Ferial Ismail Ashraff (born August 20, 1953) is a Sri Lankan politician. She was the wife of M. H. M. Ashraff, the deceased leader of the Sri Lanka Muslim Congress and the National Unity Alliance. She was the Minister of Housing and Common Amenities under President Chandrika Kumaratunga. She was a representative of Ampara District for the United People's Freedom Alliance in the Parliament of Sri Lanka. She resides in Colombo.

In 2010, she was appointed to the board of the National Institute of Education. In 2011 she was appointed to the position of Sri Lanka High Commissioner to Singapore.

Further reading

See also 
List of political families in Sri Lanka
Sri Lankan Non Career Diplomats

References

1953 births
Living people
Members of the 11th Parliament of Sri Lanka
Members of the 12th Parliament of Sri Lanka
Members of the 13th Parliament of Sri Lanka
Government ministers of Sri Lanka
Sri Lanka Freedom Party politicians
Sri Lanka Muslim Congress politicians
United People's Freedom Alliance politicians
High Commissioners of Sri Lanka to Singapore
Women legislators in Sri Lanka
Housing ministers of Sri Lanka
21st-century Sri Lankan women politicians
Women government ministers of Sri Lanka
Sri Lankan women ambassadors